Herbert Claiborne Pell IV (born November 17, 1981) is an American lawyer, military officer, and politician. He is a commander and judge advocate in the United States Coast Guard Reserve, and served as the Deputy Assistant Secretary for International and Foreign Language Education in the United States Department of Education. He is the grandson of the late Senator Claiborne Pell. Pell ran for the 2014 Democratic Party nomination for Governor of Rhode Island in a competitive three-way race ultimately won by Rhode Island State Treasurer Gina Raimondo.

Early life and education
Pell was born to Herbert C. Pell III and Eugenia Stillman Diehl Pell on November 17, 1981, in Tucson, Arizona. Pell is the grandson of Senator Claiborne Pell and Nuala Pell (the granddaughter of A&P grocery chain founder George Huntington Hartford). Through his grandfather, he is a direct descendant of Wampage I, a Siwanoy chieftain.

Pell attended The Thacher School and graduated in 2000. He also attended the School Year Abroad (SYA) in Zaragoza, Spain (1999) and Beijing, China (2001). He graduated from Harvard College in 2005 with high honors and a bachelor's degree in social studies.  Pell also received a Citation in Modern Standard Arabic from Harvard.  Pell went on to graduate from Georgetown University Law Center with a J.D. in 2008.

Career
In 2009, Pell joined the United States Coast Guard and graduated first in his class from the Coast Guard Direct Commission Officer School.  He served on active duty as a judge advocate from 2009 to 2011.  He currently is a commander and judge advocate in the United States Coast Guard Reserve.

Pell served as Director for Strategic Planning on the National Security Staff, and was a White House Fellow from 2011 to 2012.

In 2013, Pell served as Deputy Assistant Secretary of the Office of International and Foreign Language Education at the United States Department of Education. His support for language education and cultural proficiency was recognized by the Northeast Conference on the Teaching of Foreign Languages which presented him with its Advocacy Award in 2014—an award Pell's grandfather received in 1988.  

On January 27, 2014, Pell confirmed he would run for Governor of Rhode Island in the 2014 election His then-wife, Michelle Kwan, appeared in TV ads on his behalf to garner support among female voters before the September 9th, 2014 primary. Pell placed third in the Democratic primary, which was won by Gina Raimondo.

In 2016, Pell was elected as a presidential elector from Rhode Island and served as President of the Rhode Island Electoral College.

In 2020, Stanford University awarded Pell the Sloan Fellowship at its Graduate School of Business.

Personal life
In January 2013, Pell married five-time world figure skating champion and two-time Olympic medalist Michelle Kwan. The two first met in April 2011. In 2017, Pell announced in a statement that he had filed for divorce from Kwan. 

On February 2, 2021, Pell announced he had married his former high school classmate Youna Kim.

Pell is a Christian. He speaks English, Spanish, Mandarin Chinese, and Arabic.

References

External links

American military lawyers
Georgetown University Law Center alumni
Harvard College alumni
Living people
Politicians from Providence, Rhode Island
Politicians from Tucson, Arizona
Rhode Island Democrats
United States Coast Guard officers
United States Department of Education officials
2016 United States presidential electors
White House Fellows
1981 births
The Thacher School alumni
Lawyers from Tucson, Arizona
Pell family